Mary C. Stiner is the Regents' Professor of Anthropology in the School of Anthropology, University of Arizona, Tucson and Curator of Zooarchaeology at the Arizona State Museum. She is known for, among other things, her work studying the death rituals of early hominids.

Education
M.A. Anthropology (Archaeology), University of New Mexico, Albuquerque, New Mexico
B.A. Anthropology, University of Delaware, Newark, Delaware
B.F.A. Fine Arts (Painting and Ceramic Sculpture), University of Delaware, Newark, Delaware

Publications

Books
The Faunas of Hayonim Cave (Israel): A 200,000-Year Record of Paleolithic Diet, Demography & Society (published in 2005 with Peabody Museum Press of Harvard University)

Articles
"Changes in the 'connectedness' and resilience of Paleolithic societies in Mediterranean ecosystems" (Stiner & Kuhn, 2006, Human Ecology)
"What's a mother to do? A hypothesis about the division of labor and modern human origins" (Kuhn & Stiner, 2006, Current Anthropology 47)
"Hearth-side socioeconomics, hunting and paleoecology during the late Lower Paleolithic at Qesem Cave, Israel" (Stiner et al. J Human Evol 2011)
"Finding a common band-width: Causes of convergence and diversity in Paleolithic beads" (2014, Biological Theory 9(1): 51–64)
"Love and death in the Stone Age: What constitutes first evidence of mortuary treatment of the human body?" (2017, Biological Theory 12(4): 248–261)

References

University of Arizona faculty
American curators
American women curators
Living people
1955 births
American women anthropologists
American anthropologists
American women academics